James Waters Gilchrist (born May 1, 1965) is an American politician who served as delegate for Maryland's 17th legislative district from 2007 to 2023, representing Rockville and Gaithersburg.

During his first term, he served on the Ways and Means Committee, where he sat on the Education Subcommittee, the Finance Resources Subcommittee, the Joint Committee on Children, Youth and Families and the Joint Committee on Base Realignment and Closure. For his second term, he moved to the Environmental Matters Committee, where he serves on the Housing and Real Properties Subcommittee and the Environment Subcommittee.

Prior to his election, he worked as Research Historian for History Associates, Inc., Community Development Officer for the Department of Housing and Community Development, Policy Analyst for the Department of Legislative Services, and Legislative Analyst for the Montgomery County Office of Intergovernmental Relations. Gilchrist currently serves as treasurer to the board of directors of the Potomac Area Council of Hosteling International. In his community, he has been treasurer of the Alliance of Rockville Citizens, vice president of Americana Centre Condominiums, and chair of the Alliance of Rockville Neighborhood Associations. He has served on the Task Force to Explore the Incorporation of the Principles of Universal Design for Learning into the Education Systems in Maryland, the Commission on Civic Literacy, and the County Affairs Committee on the Montgomery County Delegation.

A resident of Rockville, Jim Gilchrist was raised in Montgomery County, the son of two-term County Executive, Charles W. Gilchrist. He received his BA in English from Grinnell College in Iowa, and an MBA from George Washington University.

In September 2021, Gilchrist announced that he would not seek a fifth term to the House of Delegates in 2022.

Legislative notes
 voted for the Healthy Air Act in 2006 (SB154)
 voted in favor of increasing the sales tax by 20% – Tax Reform Act of 2007(HB2)
 voted in favor of in-state tuition for undocumented immigrants in 2007 (HB6)

References

External links
Maryland House of Delegates, Delegates by District
Maryland House of Delegates, James W. Gilchrist

1965 births
Living people
Grinnell College alumni
George Washington University School of Business alumni
Maryland Democrats
21st-century American politicians
Politicians from Washington, D.C.